Ruth Yaron (born May 29, 1957, Constantine, Algeria) is a Senior diplomat in the Israeli Ministry of Foreign Affairs.

Biography
Yaron emigrated to Israel with her family From Constantine , Algeria  when she was four years old.  They lived in Be'er Sheba where she attended the local schools.  After serving in the military, she completed her B.A. in Political Science and International Relations at the Hebrew University.  When she graduated, she completed the Ministry of Foreign Affairs' cadet course, and since then she has served as part of the Israeli diplomatic corp.  Since then she earned a M. A. in Political Science and National Security from Haifa University, studied at the National Defense College and as of 2019, is studying for a Ph.D. in Political Science.  She lives with her husband and two children in Modi'in.

Career
From 1995 to 1997, Yaron was the head of the Jordanian department in the Ministry of Foreign Affairs.  Her duties included handling Jordan-Israel relations.  Specifically, she was charged with implementing the Peace Accord of which she participated in negotiations and signed a series of agreements with Jordan. 

In 2002, she was named spokesperson for the Israeli Defense Forces (IDF) with the rank of brigadier general. As such, she was the first woman to be a member of the General Staff forum.

References

People from Constantine, Algeria
People from Modi'in-Maccabim-Re'ut
Diplomats from Beersheba
Algerian emigrants to Israel
Israeli people of Algerian-Jewish descent
Israeli women diplomats
University of Haifa alumni
Hebrew University of Jerusalem Faculty of Social Sciences alumni
1957 births
Living people
Israel Defense Forces spokespersons
Female generals of Israel